Lea van Acken (born 20 February 1999) is a German actress.

Career
Lea van Acken had her first appearance on stage at the Karl May Festival in Bad Segeberg in 2011. She was the leading actress in the 2014 drama film Stations of the Cross directed by Dietrich Brüggemann. In this film, which was awarded with a Silver Bear at the 64th Berlin International Film Festival, she played a Catholic girl in a religiously fanatic family. One year later, she played a minor role in the fifth season of the series Homeland, which was set in Germany. She played Holocaust victim Anne Frank in the 2016 German production Das Tagebuch der Anne Frank. Van Acken also appears in the German Netflix series Dark as Silja Tiedemann.

Filmography

References

External links
 Profile at the agency Players

1999 births
Living people
German child actresses
German film actresses
21st-century German actresses
Actors from Lübeck